Trinidad & Tobago participated with a team of 71 athletes to the 2006 Commonwealth Games in Melbourne, winning three bronze medals and taking part in ten disciplines including athletics, badminton, gymnastics, hockey, shooting, table tennis and triathlon.

Medals

Gold

Silver

Bronze
 Marc Burns, Athletics, Men's 100m
 Roger Daniel, Shooting, Men's 50m Pistol
 Cleopatra Borel-Brown, Shot Put, Women's Shot Put

Trinidad & Tobago's Team at the 2006 Commonwealth Games

Field Hockey

Men's team
 Glenn Francis
 Ron Alexander
 Akim Toussaint
 Damian Gordon
 Nicholas da Costa
 Solomon Eccles
 Kwandwane Browne
 Nigel Providence
 Atiba Whittington
 Wayne Legerton
 Nel Lashley
 Nicholas Wren
 Dwain Quan Chan
 Dillet Gilkes
 Calvin Alexander
 Darren Cowie
Head coach: David Francois

Source: Trinidad & Tobago Olympic Committee website

Trinidad and Tobago at the Commonwealth Games
Nations at the 2006 Commonwealth Games
Commonwealth Games